Hodder & Stoughton was founded in 1868 as a Christian publisher. Today Hodder Faith is an imprint of Hodder & Stoughton, publishing the NIV Bible and a wide range of Christian books. Genres range from Christian lifestyle issues to popular theology and even some Christian fiction.

The NIV Bible is the world's most popular modern English translation.

Hodder Faith published the word-of-mouth phenomenon The Shack by Wm Paul Young in the UK in 2008. The book now has over 18 million copies in print worldwide and spent 70 weeks at number 1 in The New York Times bestseller list.

Hodder Faith authors include Rob Parsons, Philip Yancey, J.John, Richard Foster, Joyce Meyer, R.T. Kendall, Wm Paul Young, Timothy Keller, John Eldredge and Chief Rabbi Jonathan Sacks.

Notable recent publications
 Prayer: Does it Make Any Difference? by Philip Yancey
 The Shack by Wm Paul Young
 The Great Partnership by Jonathan Sacks
 Life with God by Richard Foster
 Naked Spirituality and Why Did Jesus, Moses, the Buddha and Mohammed Cross the Road by Brian D. McLaren
 Red Letter Christianity by Shane Claiborne & Tony Campolo
 Beautiful Outlaw by John Eldredge
 The Manga Bible by Siku
 Cycling Home from Siberia by Rob Lilwall

Notable backlist publications
 Celebration of Discipline and Prayer by Richard Foster
 Run Baby Run by Nicky Cruz
 Chasing the Dragon by Jackie Pullinger
 The Hiding Place by Corrie Ten Boom
 God's Smuggler by Brother Andrew (Andrew van der Bijl)

Book publishing companies of the United Kingdom